William Selwyn may refer to:

 William Selwyn (Lieutenant Governor of Jamaica) (c.1658–1702)
 William Selwyn (MP for Whitchurch) (1732–1817), represented Whitchurch (UK Parliament constituency) 
 William Selwyn (barrister) (1775-1855)
 William Selwyn (astronomer) (1806–1875)
 William Marshall Selwyn (bishop) (1879–1951)